Lebanon station is a historic train station in Lebanon, Pennsylvania. Designed by the Wilson Brothers & Company in the Shingle Style and built by the Reading Company in 1900, it consists of two sections connected by a large overhanging roof. It is located one block north of the Pennsylvania Railroad's Lebanon station.

Structure 
The smaller section is a 1 1/2-story, rectangular structure that contained a baggage room, telegraph office, and yardmasters' office. It measures 55 ft 6 in by 32 ft 6 in. It has a hipped gable roof with bellcast hiIerpped gable dormers and a two-story octagonal tower.

The larger section is a two-story structure measuring approximately 80 ft 6 in by 32 ft 6 in and contained men's and women's waiting areas and restrooms. It features a large octagonal tower rising 70 80 ft above the station and has a hipped gable roof with hipped gable dormers and a semicircular bay.

History 
In addition to the Reading, the Cornwall Railroad operated passenger trains at the station until the company discontinued passenger service on January 29, 1929. Passenger service on the Reading ended on April 28, 1963.

The station listed on the National Register of Historic Places as the Reading Railroad Station in 1975.

References

Former Reading Company stations
Railway stations on the National Register of Historic Places in Pennsylvania
Shingle Style architecture in Pennsylvania
Railway stations in the United States opened in 1900
Transportation buildings and structures in Lebanon County, Pennsylvania
National Register of Historic Places in Lebanon County, Pennsylvania
Former railway stations in Pennsylvania